Aaron Estrada (born February 3, 2001) is an American college basketball player for the Hofstra Pride of the Colonial Athletic Association (CAA). He previously played for the Saint Peter's Peacocks and the Oregon Ducks.

High school career
Estrada attended Woodbury Junior-Senior High School. As a junior, he averaged 21.5 points, seven rebounds and six assists per game. Estrada scored 23 points and made the game-winning foul shots as the Thundering Herd beat Cresskill High School 60–58 to capture their first Group 1 state title. He transferred to St. Benedict's Prep for his senior year. Estrada was featured in a documentary series called Benedict Men, on the streaming platform Quibi. In July 2019, Estrada committed to playing college basketball for Saint Peter's, choosing the Peacocks over East Carolina, Robert Morris, and Wagner.

College career
Estrada averaged 8.1 points, 2.5 rebounds, and 1.9 assists per game as a freshman. He earned MAAC Rookie of the Year honors. Estrada opted to transfer to Oregon after the season, choosing the Ducks over Creighton and Syracuse. As a sophomore, he averaged 3.1 points and 1.9 rebounds per game, shooting 42.3 percent from the field. Following the season, Estrada transferred to Hofstra. After arriving at Hofstra, he focused on losing weight and improving his three-point shooting. On February 5, 2022, Estrada scored a career-high 35 points in a 85–78 overtime win against James Madison. He was named Colonial Athletic Association's Player of the Year. He repeated as conference player of the year the following season after averaging 20.3 points per game (second in the CAA) while leading Hofstra to a share of the regular season championship.

Career statistics

College

|-
| style="text-align:left;"| 2019–20
| style="text-align:left;"| Saint Peter's
| 28 || 14 || 19.4 || .405 || .340 || .879 || 2.5 || 1.9 || .7 || .0 || 8.1
|-
| style="text-align:left;"| 2020–21
| style="text-align:left;"| Oregon
| 9 || 0 || 12.4 || .423 || .214 || .750 || 1.9 || .8 || .3 || .0 || 3.1
|-
| style="text-align:left;"| 2021–22
| style="text-align:left;"| Hofstra
| 32 || 32 || 35.2 || .477 || .330 || .935 || 5.7 || 5.0 || 1.5 || .2 || 18.5
|- class="sortbottom"
| style="text-align:center;" colspan="2"| Career
| 69 || 46 || 25.8 || .455 || .325 || .906 || 3.9 || 3.2 || 1.0 || .1 || 12.3

References

External links
Hofstra Pride bio
Oregon Ducks bio
Saint Peter's Peacocks bio

2001 births
Living people
American men's basketball players
Basketball players from New Jersey
Hofstra Pride men's basketball players
Oregon Ducks men's basketball players
Point guards
Shooting guards
Saint Peter's Peacocks men's basketball players
Sportspeople from Woodbury, New Jersey
St. Benedict's Preparatory School alumni
Woodbury Junior-Senior High School alumni